The Finns Party, formerly known as the True Finns (PS, Sannf.), is a right-wing populist political party in Finland. It was founded in 1995 following the dissolution of the Finnish Rural Party.

The party achieved its electoral breakthrough in the 2011 Finnish parliamentary election, when it won 19.1% of votes, becoming the third largest party in the Finnish Parliament. In the 2015 election the party got 17.7% of the votes, making it the parliament's second-largest political party. The party was in opposition for the first 20 years of its existence. In 2015, it joined the coalition government formed by Prime Minister Juha Sipilä. Following a 2017 split, over half of the party's MPs left the parliamentary group and were subsequently expelled from their party membership. This defector group, Blue Reform, continued to support the government coalition, while the Finns Party went into opposition. The party, having been reduced to 17 seats after the split, increased its representation to 39 seats in the 2019 Finnish parliamentary election, while Blue Reform failed to win any seats.

History

Finnish Rural Party
The predecessor of the Finns Party was the Finnish Rural Party (SMP), founded by Agrarian League dissident Veikko Vennamo in 1959. Vennamo ran into serious disagreement with Arvo Korsimo, the Agrarian League's party secretary, and was excluded from the parliamentary group. As a result, Vennamo immediately started building his own organization and founded the Finnish Rural Party. Vennamo was a populist and became a critic of President Urho Kekkonen and of political corruption within the "old parties", particularly the Centre Party (the renamed Agrarian League). The Rural Party achieved two major victories in the elections of 1970 and 1983, winning 18 and 17 seats respectively. In the 1970s, Vennamo's personalized leadership style alienated some in the party, which led to a split in the parliamentary group in 1972. After the Rural Party's new rise in 1983 under Vennamo's son Pekka, the party became a partner in two coalition governments. However, the party's support declined steadily in the late-1980s and early-1990s. In 1995, the party won only one seat in the Finnish parliament and soon filed for bankruptcy.

Founding of the Finns Party and its rise in popularity

In the summer of 1995, following the collapse of the Finnish Rural Party, the decision to found the Finns Party was made by Timo Soini, Raimo Vistbacka, Urpo Leppänen and Kari Bärlund. Soini had been the Rural Party's last party secretary and Vistbacka its last chairman and MP. The party collected the five thousand signatures needed for registration and was added to the official party register on 13 October 1995. The first party congress was held in November. Vistbacka was elected party chairman and Soini the party secretary.

It took some time before the Finns Party gained ground in Finnish elections. At the time of its founding in 1995, the party's sole MP was Vistbacka, who was reelected in the 1999 election. In 2003, the party won three seats: besides Vistbacka, Soini and Tony Halme were elected. In the 2007, the party gained two further seats for a total of five. In the 2008 municipal election, the Finns Party were most successful in those districts where the Social Democrats and the Left Alliance lost most. In the 2011 election, the Centre Party suffered the largest blow from the Finns Party's success.

According to a 2008–2009 study, Finns Party supporters viewed themselves as centrist: on a scale where 1 was extreme left and 10 was extreme right, the average supporter placed themselves at 5.4. According to the same study, the supporters were united by patriotism and social conservatism. A 2011 study indicated that the Finns Party was the most popular party among voters with an annual income of 35,000–50,000 euros, while over a quarter of the party's voters earn over 50,000 per year. The same study also indicated that the party's voters included a higher percentage of blue collar workers than those of the Social Democrats.

Timo Soini

Timo Soini led the Finns Party for twenty years, from 1997 until 2017. He was first elected to the parliament in 2003. He was the party's candidate in the 2006 presidential election, and was elected to the European Parliament in 2009 with the highest personal vote share in the country. He served as an MEP for two years, returning to the Finnish parliament in the 2011 election. Soini was the party's presidential candidate for a second time in the election of 2012. Jussi Halla-aho succeeded Soini as party chairman in 2017.

2011–2017

The Finns Party obtained 39 seats in the 2011 election, making them the third largest party, narrowly behind the National Coalition Party (44) and the Social Democrats (42). Soini received 43,212 personal votes, the highest number of all candidates, leaving behind the Foreign Minister Alexander Stubb and the Finance Minister Jyrki Katainen in their Uusimaa electoral district. The popularity of the party rose from 4.1% to 19.1% in just four years. Helsingin Sanomat wrote in an editorial that the party and Soini had "rewritten the electoral history books". According to political analyst Jan Sundberg, Soini had the ability to appeal to common people and make complicated things look easy. The election result was also referred to as "shocking" and "exceptional".

After the election, the National Coalition Party (NCP) began negotiations aiming to form a cabinet between the NCP, the Social Democrats, and the Finns Party. However, when it became clear that the NCP and the Social Democrats would continue to support EU bailouts, which the Finns Party vehemently opposed during the electoral campaign, the party voluntarily broke from the negotiations to become the leading opposition party. Soini said that the party would not compromise its core principles just to enter the government. According to an opinion poll, most of the party's supporters accepted this decision.

The Finns Party's popularity initially continued to rise after the 2011 election: in one opinion poll from June 2011 gave the party a record popularity of 23 percent. The party's membership rose to over 8,000 members by 2013 (up from circa 5,500 in 2011 and circa 1,000 in 2005). Membership in the party's youth organisation rose as well, going from 800 before the 2011 election to over 2,200 in 2013.

The party nominated Soini as its candidate for the 2012 presidential election; Soini finished fourth with 9.4 percent. Soini interpreted the result by saying that half of the party's voters wanted him for president, while the other half wanted to him to remain as party chairman. In municipal elections later in 2012, the party got 12.3 percent of votes and 1,195 seats in the municipal councils, up more than 750 from the previous municipal election. However, this result saw the votes for the party shrink significantly from the 2011 parliamentary election result. The party got 12.9 percent of votes in the 2014 European Parliament election and increased its number of MEPs to two.

In the 2015 election, the Finns Party got 17.7% of the votes and 38 seats. This meant that they were the third largest party by votes but the second largest party by seats. The Finns Party subsequently entered into a coalition government with the Centre Party and the NCP, led by Prime Minister Juha Sipilä. The party's participation in the Sipilä Cabinet marked a softening of its Eurosceptic positions. On 22 June 2016, Finns Party MP Maria Tolppanen joined the Social Democrats, after which the Finns Party had 37 seats in the parliament. In March 2017, Soini announced that he would step down as party chairman in the next party congress in June.

2017 leadership election and splits 

In June 2017, Jussi Halla-aho and Sampo Terho faced off in the leadership election, in which Halla-aho received 949 votes against Terho's 646 votes and thus succeeded Soini as party chairman. Sipilä and Finance Minister Petteri Orpo soon announced that they would not continue their coalition with the Finns Party if it was led by Halla-aho. Subsequently, twenty Finns Party MPs, including Soini and Terho, defected to form a new parliamentary group under the name New Alternative, later renamed into Blue Reform. As all cabinet ministers were among the defectors, the Blue Reform made an agreement with Sipilä to stay in the government.

Following the split, MPs Veera Ruoho and Arja Juvonen left the Finns Party parliamentary group to continue as independents, after which the party's seats were reduced to fifteen. All of the defecting MPs were subsequently expelled from the Finns Party. In the following weeks, MPs Ritva Elomaa and Arja Juvonen regretted their decision and re-joined the party, raising the amount of MPs to seventeen.

The party nominated MP Laura Huhtasaari as its candidate for the 2018 presidential election. In the election, Huhtasaari placed third with 6.9 percent of the votes, while the incumbent president Sauli Niinistö went on to secure his second term with a majority of votes. At the 2019 Finnish parliamentary election the Finns Party finished in second place and increased its number of MPs to 39 (with its strongest result being in Satakunta) while the breakaway Blue Reform party lost all of its seats.

On June 21, 2021, Jussi Halla-aho announced that he will retire from his position as a party leader in August 2021. He was succeeded by MP Riikka Purra on August 14.

Since 2020, further splits have emerged within the party, forming the Power Belongs to the People and Blue-and-Black Movement.

In the European Parliament
When the Finns Party first gained representation in the European Parliament in 2009, it became a founding member of the Europe of Freedom and Democracy Group (EFD) in the Parliament. After the 2014 election, however, the party chose to leave the EFD to join the European Conservatives and Reformists Group (ECR). Commenting on the party's choice of group, party secretary Riikka Slunga-Poutsalo said in 2014 that joining a right-wing parliamentary group would not change the party's characteristic of being a "centre-left workers' party". After the 2019 election the party joined the Identity and Democracy Group.

Ideology
Ideologically, the Finns Party has been described as right-wing and far-right. It is a nationalist and national-conservative party that opposes immigration, while on foreign stances they are eurosceptic. The party combines left-wing economic policies and economic nationalism with socially conservative values, and ethnic nationalism. Several researchers have described the party as fiscally centre-left, socially conservative, a "centre-based populist party" or the "most left-wing of the non-socialist parties", whereas other scholars have described them as radically right-wing populist. In the parliament seating order, the party was seated in the centre of the plenary until 2019 when they were moved to the right of the plenary despite their opposition to the move. The party's supporters have described themselves as centrists. The party has drawn people from left-wing parties but central aspects of their manifesto have gained support from right-wing voters as well.  The Finns Party has been compared by international media to the other Nordic populist parties and other similar nationalist and right-wing populist movements in Europe, whilst noting its strong support for the Finnish welfare state.

Policies and platform

In evaluating the Finns Party's 70-page programme for the 2011 election Mikko Lahtinen, political scientist in the University of Tampere, and Markku Hyrkkänen, historian of ideas in the University of Turku, note that nationalism is a theme consistently repeated throughout the programme. According to them the party presents populism as a noble ideology, which seeks to empower the people. Lahtinen describes the rhetoric used in the program as a refreshing change to the politically correct "jargon" of mainstream media, and believes that the Finns Party may have succeeded in gaining supporters from the traditional left-wing parties by presenting a more attractive form of criticism of neoliberalism than those parties.

Ville Pernaa, political scientist, described the party's 2015 electoral program by saying that the Finns Party combines elements of both right-wing and left-wing politics along with populist rhetoric.

Policies of the Finns Party in 2011 include the following:

Fiscal policies

 Progressive taxation and the welfare state

The Finns Party has proposed more progressivity to taxes to avoid the establishment of flat taxation. The party has called for the raising of the capital gains tax and the re-institution of the wealth tax. According to the party, the willingness to pay taxes is best guaranteed by a society unified by correct social policies – the electoral program warns against individualist policies, which weaken the solidarity among citizens. "The willingness to pay taxes is guaranteed by having a unified people", the program reads (p. 46).

Some observers have compared the Finns Party's fiscal policies to the old national Social Democratic taxation policy, which has given the left-wing brand to the Finns Party. During the electoral campaign in 2011 Soini stated that he preferred the Social Democrats over the center-right National Coalition Party as a possible coalition partner in a future cabinet. Soini has stated that the Finns Party is a "workers' party without socialism". A researcher for the opinion polling company Taloustutkimus agreed, describing the Finns Party as a "non-socialist workers' party".

 State support for rural regions, including support for agriculture

The Finns Party's rural policy program suggests state subsidies to relieve the effect of structural changes on the rural areas. This policy is shared by the Centre Party in Finland and originates from the agrarian and rural policies of both parties.

 Increased state investment in infrastructure and industry

The Finns Party favours state investments in infrastructure and industry as well. A tendency towards favouring old industrial policies have led some political analysts to label the Finns Party as a center-left party.

Energy policies
 Aspiration to energy self-reliance and support for nuclear energy
 Pro-industry environmental policy – opposition to green tax reform and to taxpayers' involvement in emission trading funds
 The Party of the Finns strongly supports the peat industry, which produces massive amounts of greenhouse gases, having even proposed exempting this production from any tax. The party generally scores best in municipalities whose economies are tied to this industry. The party has strongly denounced the Paris Climate Agreement, signed in December 2015, saying it was "catastrophic" for the economy, and demanded that the private sector and taxpayers be spared its "disastrous economic consequences".

Cultural policies
 Teaching "healthy national pride" in schools, because the unity of citizens is the basis of society.
 Removal of the obligatory character of the second official language (Swedish in Finnish-language schools and vice versa) in curriculums on all levels of education, freeing up time for the learning of other foreign languages such as English, German, French, Spanish and Russian (especially in the eastern part of the country). Obviously allowance regarding the use of the Swedish language and its teaching will have to be made for those communes where Swedish-speaking populations are in the majority or a large percentage of the population – Swedish is one of Finland's national languages.
 Support for cultural activities that "promote Finnish identity"

The cultural program of the Finns Party, which proposed subsidizing traditional art over postmodernist art, prompted criticism from outside the party and generated debate within the party as well. Some critics of the policy called it overtly populist or said that the state should not interfere with the content of art. A poll commissioned by Helsingin Sanomat at the time of the controversy found that a majority, 51 percent, of Finns agreed with the party's stance on ending subsidies for postmodern art.

Social policies
 Rejection of gender identity, opposition to same-sex marriage, same-sex adoption and in vitro fertilization given to same-sex couples and single women.

Immigration policies
Regarding immigration policy the 2011 manifesto emphasises:

 Limiting humanitarian immigration strictly to refugee quotas (which should be adapted to correspond with the economic situation),
 Limiting family unification to proven direct relatives only, and requiring means of subsistence from the immigrant,
 Deporting those immigrants guilty of serious or recurrent crimes or those that does not meet the Immigration laws,
 Welcoming work-based immigration, provided the immigrants pay taxes and abide by Finnish labour laws,
 Granting Finnish nationality after five years' residence in Finland, provided the immigrant masters Finnish, has no criminal record, and has means of subsistence
 
The party also requires that immigrants accept Finnish cultural norms. The only written declaration to the European Parliament made by a True Finn MEP also concerns immigration matters. The party underlines the role of national sovereignty in immigration issues:

In 2015 the party's immigration programme included demands like:

 Lowering the refugee quota
 Opposition to the planned burden-sharing mechanisms of the Common European Asylum Policy
 Opposition to using public funds to advance multiculturalism
 Tightening the conditions of family unification by migrants
 Allowing the immigration of workers from outside the EU and EEA countries only if they are found to be necessary in a given field in a means test by the Finnish Labour Office
 Making sure that migrants living on welfare benefits are not concentrated in the same areas
 Outlawing begging in public places
 Ending positive discrimination

In their 2019 election manifesto the party called for a prohibition on wearing the burqa and the niqab in public.

Timo Soini signed a pan-European charter against racism in 1998. However, in 2009, before the European Parliament election, Soini refused to sign an anti-racism appeal, saying that the appeal was an attempt to influence the party's choice of candidates (the appeal was drawn up by another political party). All other Finnish parties signed this appeal against racism. In May 2011, following controversies surrounding the remarks of the Finns Party's MP Teuvo Hakkarainen, the Finns Party's parliamentary group issued a statement condemning all racism and discrimination, including affirmative action. The party invited other parties to sign the statement as well, but no other party did so. In December 2011, an opinion poll revealed 51% of Finns Party voters agreed with the statement, "Joihinkin rotuihin kuuluvat ihmiset eivät kerta kaikkiaan sovi asumaan moderniin yhteiskuntaan;" "People of certain races are absolutely, categorically unable to live within (fit into) a modern society."

Foreign and defence policies
The party also does:

 Opposition to the integration of the European Union and opposition to Finnish Eurozone membership.
 Reductions in foreign aid

Timo Soini has been an outspoken critic of both the EU and NATO, but has stated that if a choice had to be made, NATO is a lesser evil than the EU. The Finns Party favors non-alliance or neutrality, as international activities abroad for the Defence Forces would undermine the defence budget's funds for sustaining a large conscript army of war-time personnel (which is 350,000) to guarantee the defence of all of Finland. When the Finnish Parliament voted to ratify the Ottawa Treaty, banning anti-personnel mines, in November 2011, the Finns Party was the only party unified in opposing the treaty.

The party believes in national sovereignty: 

Shortly after the leadership election of Jussi Halla-aho, the party hardened its position towards the European Union. In 2017, Laura Huhtasaari stated that she would support leaving the EU should she win the 2018 Finnish presidential election citing the growth of the Union's power at the expense of the member states. Other party members have supported the idea of Finland withdrawing from both the Schengen Agreement and the Eurozone. In its latest platform, the Finns Party states that it supports a "European policy" based on appreciation for Western and Christian shaped values. The party argues that Finland is needed in the European Parliament to defend Finnish interests in the short-term, but states the "long-term strategic goal" is to take gradual steps to withdraw Finland from the European Union and proposes introducing a parallel currency within Finland to initiate phasing out Finnish membership of the Eurozone.

Initially, the party was opposed to Finnish admission into NATO in its 2011 program, however following the 2022 Russian invasion of Ukraine the party signaled a change to this policy and stated it was willing to back NATO membership.

Judicial policies
During the 2011 election the party's judicial programme included:
 Tougher punishments for violent crime
 More resources for police and prosecutors
 Opposition to any incorporation of Sharia law into judicial practices

Election results

Parliamentary elections

Presidential elections

European Parliament elections

Municipal elections

Leadership

Chairmanship and party secretaries

The party chairmanship is divided between four persons, elected at party congress biannually. Riikka Purra is the party's chair. The first deputy chair is Leena Meri, the second deputy chair is Mauri Peltokangas and the third deputy chair is Sebastian Tynkkynen.

Raimo Vistbacka chaired the Finns Party from 1995 to 1997. The party secretary Timo Soini succeeded Vistbacka as chairman in 1997.

Rolf Sormo followed Timo Soini as party secretary and served from 1997 to 1999. The third party secretary, Hannu Purho, served for eight years, from 1999 to 2007. After him, Timo Soini's parliamentary assistant, Ossi Sandvik, was elected party secretary in 2007. He was succeeded by Riikka Slunga-Poutsalo, who was elected as party secretary in 2013. She was succeeded by Simo Grönroos in 2019, who was in turn succeeded by Arto Luukkanen.

Board
The board of the Finns Party has 13 members: the party chairman, the three deputy chairs, the party secretary, chair of the parliamentary group and seven other members.

Foundations
The foundation Perussuomalaisten tukisäätiö ("The Finns Party support fund") was founded in 1990. It used the name SMP:n tukisäätiö until 2006. The fund borrowed 1.7 million euros from the party in 2012 to buy a 450 m2 commercial property in downtown Helsinki on Yrjönkatu for use as the Party's new headquarters. The Party rented these premises from the fund. Following the split of 2017, this foundation was left in the control the defector group, Blue Reform.

Another foundation, Suomen Perusta ("The Foundation of Finland"), was set up in 2012. Its role is to function as a think tank affiliated with the party.

Elected representatives and leaders

Current Members of the Finnish Parliament
Ville Tavio is the current chairman of the parliamentary group.

 Sanna Antikainen (Savonia-Karelia, 2019–)
 Juho Eerola (South-East, 2011–)
 Kike Elomaa (Finland Proper, 2011–)
 Jussi Halla-aho (Helsinki, 2011–14, 2019–)
 Petri Huru (Satakunta, 2019–)
 Olli Immonen (Oulu, 2011–)
 Vilhelm Junnila (Finland Proper, 2019–)
 Kaisa Juuso (Lapland, 2019–)
 Arja Juvonen (Uusimaa, 2011–)
 Toimi Kankaanniemi (Central Finland, 2015–)
 Ari Koponen (Uusimaa, 2019–)
 Jari Koskela (Satakunta, 2019–)
 Jouni Kotiaho (Central Finland, 2019–)
 Sheikki Laakso (South-East, 2019–)
 Rami Lehto (Tavastia, 2015–)
 Mikko Lundén (Finland Proper, 2019–)
 Leena Meri (Uusimaa, 2015–)
 Juha Mäenpää (Vaasa, 2019–)
 Jani Mäkelä (South-East, 2015–)
 Jukka Mäkynen (Vaasa, 2019–)
 Veijo Niemi (Pirkanmaa, 2019–)
 Mika Niikko (Uusimaa, 2011–)
 Tom Packalén (Helsinki, 2011–)
 Mauri Peltokangas (Vaasa, 2019–)
 Sakari Puisto (Pirkanmaa, 2019–)
 Riikka Purra (Uusimaa, 2019–)
 Lulu Ranne (Tavastia, 2019–)
 Mari Rantanen (Helsinki, 2019–)
 Minna Reijonen (Savonia-Karelia, 2019–)
 Jari Ronkainen (Tavastia, 2015–)
 Sami Savio (Pirkanmaa, 2015–)
 Jenna Simula (Oulu, 2019–)
 Riikka Slunga-Poutsalo (Uusimaa, 2019–)
 Ville Tavio (Finland Proper, 2015–)
 Sebastian Tynkkynen (Oulu, 2019–)
 Veikko Vallin (Pirkanmaa, 2019–)
 Ville Vähämäki (Oulu, 2011–)
 Jussi Wihonen (Savonia-Karelia, 2019–)
Ano Turtiainen was expelled from the parliamentary group in June 2020 due to a tweet he made about the murder of George Floyd. Since Turtiainen became an independent MP, the parliamentary group of the Finns Party is no longer the biggest opposition group (tied with the National Coalition).

Former Members of the Finnish Parliament

 Simon Elo (2015–17; defected to Blue Reform in 2017)
 Tiina Elovaara (2015–17; defected to Blue Reform in 2017)
 Teuvo Hakkarainen (2011–2019)
 Tony Halme (2003–07)
 James Hirvisaari (2011–13; expelled from the party in 2013)
 Reijo Hongisto (2011–17; defected to Blue Reform in 2017)
 Laura Huhtasaari (2015–2019)
 Laila Koskela (2011–14; defected to the Centre Party in 2014)
 Lauri Heikkilä (2011–15)
 Ari Jalonen (2011–17; defected to Blue Reform in 2017)
 Anssi Joutsenlahti (2011–15; Rural MP 1979–87)
 Johanna Jurva (2011–15)
 Pietari Jääskeläinen (2009–15)
 Pentti Kettunen (2011–15; Rural MP 1983–87, 1989–91)
 Kimmo Kivelä (2011–17; defected to Blue Reform in 2017)
 Osmo Kokko (2011–15)
 Kari Kulmala (2015–17; defected to Blue Reform in 2017)
 Jari Lindström (2011–17, Minister for Justice and Employment 2015–19; defected to Blue Reform in 2017)
 Maria Lohela (2011–17, Speaker of the Parliament 2015–2018; defected to Blue Reform in 2017)
 Anne Louhelainen (2011–17; defected to Blue Reform in 2017)
 Pirkko Mattila (2011–17; Minister for Social Affairs and Health 2016–19, defected to Blue Reform in 2017)
 Lea Mäkipää (2011–17; Rural MP 1983–95; defected to Blue Reform in 2017)
 Hanna Mäntylä (2011–17, Minister for Social Affairs and Health 2015–2016; defected to Blue Reform in 2017)
 Martti Mölsä (2011–17; defected to Blue Reform in 2017)
 Jussi Niinistö (2011–17, Minister for Defence 2015–19; defected to Blue Reform in 2017)
 Pentti Oinonen (2007–11; defected to Blue Reform in 2017)
 Mika Raatikainen (2014–19)
 Veera Ruoho (2015–17; defected to the National Coalition Party in 2017)
 Pirkko Ruohonen-Lerner (2007–15)
 Vesa-Matti Saarakkala (2011–17; defected to Blue Reform in 2017)
 Timo Soini (2011–17, 2003–09, Minister for Foreign Affairs 2015–19; defected to Blue Reform in 2017)
 Ismo Soukola (2011–15)
 Sampo Terho (2015–17, Minister for European Affairs, Culture and Sports 2017–19; defected to Blue Reform in 2017)
 Maria Tolppanen (2011–16; defected to the SDP in 2016)
 Reijo Tossavainen (2011–15)
 Ano Turtiainen (2019–20, expelled from the parliamentary group in 2020 and from the party in 2021)
 Kaj Turunen (2011–17; defected to Blue Reform in 2017)
 Kauko Tuupainen (2011–15)
 Markku Uusipaavalniemi (2010–11; Centre MP 2007–10)
 Veltto Virtanen (2007–15; Ecological Party MP 1995–99)
 Raimo Vistbacka (1995–11; Rural MP 1987–95)
 Juha Väätäinen (2011–15)

Current Members of the European Parliament
 Teuvo Hakkarainen (2019–)
 Laura Huhtasaari (2019–)

Former Members of the European Parliament
 Jussi Halla-aho (2014–19)
 Pirkko Ruohonen-Lerner (2015–19)
 Timo Soini (2009–11)
 Sampo Terho (2011–15)

Party chairmen
Riikka Purra (2021–)
Jussi Halla-aho (2017–2021)
Timo Soini (1997–2017)
Raimo Vistbacka (1995–97)

Party secretaries
Arto Luukkanen (2021–)
Simo Grönroos (2019–2021)
Riikka Slunga-Poutsalo (2013–19)
Ossi Sandvik (2007–13)
Hannu Purho (1999–2007)
Rolf Sormo (1997–99)
Timo Soini (1995–97)

Controversies
Several Finns Party MPs and other party leaders have made public statements which others have interpreted as being racist or otherwise inflammatory. In 2011 True Finn MP James Hirvisaari was fined 1,425 euro by the Kouvola Court of Appeals for comments he made on his blog about Muslims. In 2011 President Tarja Halonen was quoted characterizing some True Finn voters as racist. Her comments were broadly condemned by the True Finn party. A 2011 book by Swedish journalist Lisa Bjurwald made a similar characterization, that the party's leaders support racist positions, while publicly denying that they do so.

In 2011 MP Pentti Oinonen declined an invitation to the presidential Independence Day ball, citing his aversion to seeing same-sex couples dance. In a judgement given on 8 June 2012, MP Jussi Halla-aho, then Chairman of the Administration Committee was found guilty by the Supreme Court of both disturbing religious worship and ethnic agitation for statements he made about Muhammad in his blog.

In October 2013 it was reported that a Finns Party member of parliament, James Hirvisaari, had invited far-right activist Seppo Lehto as his guest to the parliament. During his visit, Lehto made several Nazi salutes, including at least one instance where Hirvisaari took a photo of Lehto performing the Nazi salute from the spectator gallery overlooking the Parliament House's Session Hall. Photos and videos of Lehto performing the Nazi salute in the Parliament House were then distributed on Lehto's public Facebook page and on YouTube. After newspapers broke news of the incident, Speaker of the Parliament Eero Heinäluoma issued a notice of censure to Hirvisaari for the incident and the Finns Party leadership unanimously decided to expel Hirvisaari from the party, citing multiple cases of acting against the party's interest. Hirvisaari then became affiliated with the Change 2011 party as the party's MP, until he was unseated in the parliamentary election of 2015.

In 2020, a number of members of The Finns party in parliament criticised the Academy of Finland for funding the research of Oula Silvennoinen at the University of Helsinki on The Holocaust, the genocide of the European Jews.

Finns party politicians have frequently supported far-right and neo-nazi movements such as the Finnish Defense League, Soldiers of Odin, Nordic Resistance Movement (NRM), Rajat Kiinni (Close the Borders), and Suomi Ensin (Finland First). An anti-mosque demonstration was supported by the youth branch of the PS, whose chairman, Jarmo Keto, said that, "Islam as an ideology is responsible for many conflicts and terror attacks. Thus such a mosque project is an irresponsible idea." There have been numerous cases where members of the Finns Party have attracted criticism from the other parties and antifascists for attending events organized by or with the NRM. Several members of the Finns Party took part in an event where the participants shot and threw knives at targets, using photos of members of the Rinne Cabinet and attended an event commemorating Eugen Schauman who assassinated Nikolay Bobrikov.

See also 
 List of political parties in Finland

Notes

References

Further reading

External links

 
Right-wing populism in Finland
Nationalist parties in Finland
Eurosceptic parties in Finland
Anti-Islam sentiment in Europe
Anti-Islam political parties in Europe
Economic nationalism
European Conservatives and Reformists member parties
1995 establishments in Finland
Political parties established in 1995
Parties represented in the European Parliament
Registered political parties in Finland
Right-wing populist parties
National conservative parties
Social conservative parties
Conservative parties in Finland
Right-wing parties in Europe
Nordic agrarian parties